The Lebanese University (LU) is the only public university in Beirut, Lebanon. It is ranked #701–750 worldwide in terms of education.

The creation of the Lebanese University was an idea first mentioned in the speech of the former Minister of Foreign Affairs, Mr Hamid Frangieh, during the closing ceremony of the Third UNESCO Conference in Beirut held on 11 December 1948, during which he said: "Lebanon hopes to see the creation of a Lebanese university having the spirit of UNESCO."

University presidents 
Since its inception, the Lebanese University has been headed by:

and it is headed by Dr. Bassam Badran since 2021.

Faculties and campuses 
The university issued successive decrees since its inception, establishing faculties and institutes, which contributed to its expansion and development until reaching 16 faculties:

In addition to three Doctoral Schools:

The university is also affiliated with the Institute of Applied Sciences and Economics (CNAM-ISAE), which operates in cooperation with CNAM in France.

Honorary doctorates 
The university awarded honorary doctorates to a number of heads of state and officials, including in chronological order:

In 2009, the Lebanese University started awarding honorary doctorates to Lebanese personalities, including:

Minister Fouad Boutros, Minister Ghassan Tueni, Minister Laila Solh Hamada, Former Head of Press Syndicate Mohamed Baalbaki, As-Safir's Editor-in-Chief Talal Salman, Governor of the Banque du Liban Riad Salamé, Archbishop Grégoire Haddad, writer and poet Salah Stétié, Architect Rahif Fayad, Professor Philip Salem, and artist Majida El Roumi.

Mission 
The Lebanese University is the only public institution in Lebanon carrying out the functions of the public higher education with its various majors and degrees, scientific research, and continuous training.

Ranking and reputation 

QS World University Rankings places the university at #701–750 overall, #551–600 in Medicine, #351–405 in Agriculture and Forestry worldwide. Times Higher Education World University Rankings ranks 1001–1200th in the world in 2023 and 151-175th in World reputation International Colleges & Universities ranks it the 5th in the country and 3893th worldwide.

Notable alumni
 Michel Suleiman, 11th president of Lebanon
 Najat A. Saliba, chemist and politician 
 Renée Hayek, writer and novelist
 Antoine Ghanem, Lebanese politician
 Jean Daoud, poet, playwright, philosopher
 Majida El Roumi, singer
 Serge Venturini (1979–1981), French poet
 Omar Karami, former prime minister of Lebanon
 Ahmed Nasri, president of Fahd bin Sultan University
 Ghada Owais, journalist
 Adnan Hussein, political scientist
 Mohamed Ali Yousfi, writer and translator
 Rana Hamadeh, artist
 Inaya Jaber, writer
 Jawad Fares, physician and scientist
 Marcel Ghanem, journalist
 Doumouh Al Bakkar, football referee
 Vartine Ohanian, Lebanese politician and Minister of Youth and Sports
Houssam Diab Lebanese lawyer and Ambassador Extraordinary and Plenipotentiary to the Federal Republic of Nigeria

References

External links 
 الموقع الرسمي
  Site officiel
  Official website

 
Art schools in Lebanon
Education in Beirut
Universities in Lebanon
1951 establishments in Lebanon
Educational institutions established in 1951